The Forbes Shale is a geologic formation in the Sacramento Valley of northern California, United States. It is found in the Sutter Buttes area of Sutter County, California. It preserves fossils dating back to the Coniacian stage of the Late Cretaceous period.

Fossil content 
The following fossils were reported from the formation:
Bivalves

 Cladoceramus undulatoplicatus
 Glycymerita veatchii
 Inoceramus subundatus
 I. Inoceramus vancouverensis
 I. aff. chicoensis
 I. aff. klamathensis
 I. aff. whitneyi
 Parallelodon|Parallelodon (Nanonavis) brewerlanus
 Pseudomelania colusaensis

Gastropods

 Bernaya (Protocypraea) kayei
 Biplica obliqua
 Dentalium (Entalis) whiteavesi
 Pseudomelania colusaensis
 Tessarolax distorta
 Volutoderma californica

Ammonites

 Baculites chicoensis
 B. inornatus
 Desmophyllites diphylloides
 Eupachydiscus arbucklensis
 E. willgreeni
 Eutrephoceras campbelli
 Lytoceras (Gaudryceras) alamedense
 Nowakites dobbinsi
 N. rumseyensis
 Oxybeloceras petrolense
 Parapachydiscus cortinaensis
 Puzosia (Holcodiscoides) gorrilli
 Puzosia (Parapuzosia) arenaica
 Baculites sp.
 Canadoceras sp.
 Hauericeras sp.

See also 
 
 List of fossiliferous stratigraphic units in California

References

Bibliography

Further reading 
  Google Books: The Sutter Buttes of California: A Study of Plio-Pleistocene Volcanism; Howel Williams, Garniss H. Curtis.

Geologic formations of California
Upper Cretaceous Series of North America
Cretaceous California
Coniacian Stage
Shale formations of the United States

Geology of Sutter County, California